House of DVF is an American reality television series which premiered on November 2, 2014, on the E! cable network. Announced in August 2014, the series follows the life of fashion icon Diane von Furstenberg.

Episodes

References

External links 

 
 
 

2010s American reality television series
2014 American television series debuts
2015 American television series endings
English-language television shows
E! original programming
Fashion-themed television series